The Elizabeth Quay Jetty is located at the western side of Elizabeth Quay inlet on the Swan River in Perth, Western Australia.

Transperth services

Transperth operates ferries between Elizabeth Quay and Mends Street Jetty in South Perth, with Elizabeth Quay Jetty replacing Barrack Street Jetty on this service.

References

Jetties in Perth, Western Australia
Elizabeth Quay